Frank Debenham, OBE (26 December 1883 – 23 November 1965) was Emeritus Professor of Geography at the Department of Geography, Cambridge University and first director of the Scott Polar Research Institute.

Biography
Debenham was born in Bowral, New South Wales, Australia in December 1883, the younger twin and third child of Rev. John Willmott Debenham and Edith (née Cleveland). He attended the school run by his father before attending The King's School, Parramatta where he was the top academic and sporting student of his year. He graduated from the University of Sydney with a BA in English and philosophy, then joined the staff at the Anglican Armidale School in New South Wales.

He returned to university in 1908, studying geology under Sir Edgeworth David. In 1910 he was one of a group of three geologists on Robert Falcon Scott's Antarctic Terra Nova Expedition (1910–1913). From January to March 1911 Debenham, along with three other expedition members (Thomas Griffith Taylor, Charles Wright (physicist) and Edgar Evans), explored and mapped the western mountains of Victoria Land (the western journey) performing scientific studies and geological observations. He did not take part in the ill-fated journey to the South pole due to a knee injury sustained while playing football in the snow, and instead took part in the second western journey along with Griffith Taylor, Tryggve Gran and William Forde. On his return from the expedition in 1913, he entered Cambridge University to write up his field notes.

During World War I, he was a lieutenant with the 7th Battalion, Oxfordshire and Buckinghamshire Light Infantry. Serving in France and Salonika, Debenham was severely wounded in August 1916. He married Dorothy Lucy Lempriere in January 1917 and was awarded the Order of the British Empire (O.B.E.) in 1919. The same year he went to Cambridge where he became a fellow of Gonville and Caius College and lecturer in cartography. In 1920, with the help of surplus funds raised by public donations in response to the tragedy, Debenham co-founded the Scott Polar Research Institute (Cambridge University) with Raymond Priestley, as a repository of polar information and a centre from which future expeditions could draw on support and experience. Debenham had developed the idea of such a learning centre in 1912 while in Antarctica. He was unpaid director of the Institute from 1920 to 1946. As director of the institute, Debenham, in conjunction with Priestley and one of Shackleton's Endurance scientists, James Wordie, made Cambridge the centre of polar research in Britain.

In 1931, Debenham was appointed Professor of Geography at Cambridge University. During World War II he trained service cadets, lectured to Royal Air Force navigators and devised relief-model techniques for briefing commandos. Author of "Astrographics: First Steps in Navigation by the Stars", the 2 editions in 1942 were important works for the R.A.F.'s forthcoming Bomber offensive against the 3rd Reich. He was vice-president of the Royal Geographical Society (1951–53) and was awarded their Victoria Medal in 1948.

Debenham was a prolific author; his published works include:  "In the Antarctic: Stories of Scott's Last Expedition 1952"; "Antarctica – The story of a continent"; "Discovery & Exploration"; "Kalahari Sand"; "Nyasaland"; "The way to Ilala"; "Study of African Swamp"; "Simple Surveying"; "The use of Geography"; "Map Making"; "The World is Round"; "Space – The Global Atlas".

Death
Frank Debenham died in Cambridge in 1965, aged 81, survived by his wife, a son and four daughters. He is buried at Saint Simon and Saint Judes Church in Bowral, New South Wales, Australia.

Legacy
In 2019, an ice pick that belonged to Debenham was auctioned for £22,000 by Cheffins Fine Art Auctioneers.

References

Further reading
 The Quiet Land – The Diaries of Frank Debenham, edited by June Debenham. Bluntisham Books: Huntingdon, 1992.
 

1883 births
1965 deaths
American Polar Society honorary members
Australian geographers
English geographers
Explorers of Antarctica
People from Bowral
People from Cambridge
People of the Scott Polar Research Institute
Recipients of the Polar Medal
Terra Nova expedition
Victoria Medal recipients
20th-century geographers
British Army personnel of World War I
Oxfordshire and Buckinghamshire Light Infantry officers